Cushman is a manufacturer of industrial, personal, and custom vehicles. It is based in Augusta, Georgia, United States, and is owned by Textron.

History
The Cushman scooter company started in 1903 in Lincoln, Nebraska, by Everett and Clinton Cushman. The company incorporated as Cushman Motor Works in 1913.  Cushman began production of their four-stroke Husky engine in 1922.

Cushman produced engines for farm equipment, pumps, lawn mowers, and boats. Cushman began making Auto-Glide scooters in 1936 as a means to increase the sale of Husky engines during the Great Depression. Cushman scooters were widely used by the United States Armed Forces in World War II and as an alternative to automobiles before and after the war.

One famous Cushman was the model 53, a military model from the World War II era.  Designed to be dropped by parachute with Army Airborne troops, it became known as the Cushman Airborne. Other models were used on military bases for messenger service.  The most successful model of Cushman scooter, the Eagle, was in production approximately 16 years. It resembled a motorcycle with its exposed engine and top tank.  Other Cushman models, like the post-war "turtle back" Model 50 and 60, or the economy Highlander, used a step-through design common for scooters.  The step-through design and ease of operation made it popular with men and women alike.

Some late-1950s Cushmans, designated Road King and Pacemaker, had "jet-age" body styling. Sears sold a version of these models under the Allstate brand. Cushman scooters featured an automatic centrifugal clutch, which allowed the rider to twist the right grip to accelerate. Oddly, the throttle twisted forward during acceleration, opposite the usual pattern in most other motorcycles and scooters. Cushman claimed , and advertised penny-a-mile operating cost. In comparison to European scooters, Cushman scooters had a higher weight, larger cubic capacity (up to 0.4 L), but not more power.

In 1958, 15000 Scooters were produced by Cushman. Scooter production ended in 1965, but some remaining Eagles were sold as 1966 models. After scooter production ceased, Cushman manufactured golf carts, industrial vehicles, and turf maintenance equipment. In Belgium there was a licence-production of Cushmann scooters under the label Belgian Cushman. 

Cushman Trucksters were produced from 1952 to 2002. Small and light duty, they have been used for ice cream sales, mall and stadium maintenance, and by NYPD. Cushman became a division of the Outboard Marine Corporation in 1962. Ransomes (of Great Britain) purchased Cushman in 1989, and then Textron purchased Ransomes.

Models 

 AutoGlide - Models 1-2 (1936)
 AutoGlide - Models 1-3 (1937)
 AutoGlide - Models 1-3, R-1, 5-7, 5T-7T (1938-1939)
 AutoGlide - Models 12, 14, 21, 22, 24, 29 (1940-1941)
 30 Series - Model 32 (1942-1945)
 30 Series - Model 34 (1942-1945) G679 - motor scooter, with side car, 3-wheel
 30Series - Model 39 (1942-1945) G551 or G672 - motor scooter, package delivery 3-wheel
 50 Series - Model 52 (1946-1948)
 50 Series - Model 52A (1946-1948)
 50 Series - Model 53 (1944) G683 - motor scooter, airborne 2-wheel
 50 Series - Model 53A (1946-1948) Civilian Airborne
 50 Series - Model 54 (1946-1948)
 50 Series - Model 59 (1946-1948)
 60 Series - Model 62 (1949-1956)
 60 Series - Model 62A (1949-1956)
 60 Series - Model 64 (1949-1956)
 60 Series - Model 64A (1949-1956)
 60 Series - Model 69 (1949-1956)
 710 Highlander - Model 61 (1949)
 711 Highlander (1950-1957)
 714 Highlander (1952-1957)
 715 Deluxe (1953-1957)
 721 Highlander (1958)
 721 Highlander (1959-1964)
 Allstate - Model 811:30 (1950-1957)
 Allstate - Model 811:40 (1950-1957)
 Allstate - Jetsweep (1958-1960)
 Allstate - Standard Model (1959-1961)
 720 Series - Model 722 (1957-1959)
 720 Series - Model 722 (1960-1962)
 720 Series - Model 725 (1957-1959)
 720 Series - Model 725 (1960-1962)
 The Eagle 
 Haulster, small industrial multi-purpose truck
 Truckster
 Bellhop Series, golf carts
 Tug, large truck
 Minute Miser, truck
 Titan, larger industrial multi-purpose truck
 Model C engine, patented in 1911, .  Commonly known for driving oat binders.
 Trackster, track-based ATV
 Golfster, golf cart 3-wheel & 4-wheel
 motor scooter, with side car, 3-wheel, model 34 (G679)
 The Trailster offroad model
 Westcoaster Mailster, used by the United States Postal Service
 Jacobsen models made by Cushman
 White Truck

See also 
 Golf car
 G-numbers

References

External links 

 
 Cushman Trackster Fan site

Vehicle manufacturing companies established in 1903
Textron
Truck manufacturers of the United States
Motorcycle manufacturers of the United States
Three-wheeled motor vehicles
Scooter manufacturers
Manufacturing companies based in Georgia (U.S. state)
Companies based in Augusta, Georgia